Thicke of the Night is an American late-night talk show starring Alan Thicke and broadcast in first-run syndication during the 1983–1984 TV season.

Among the regulars on Thicke of the Night were Richard Belzer, Arsenio Hall, Rick Ducommun, Charles Fleischer, Gilbert Gottfried, Michael McManus, Chloe Webb, Isabel Grandin, Alvernette Jimenez, Tamara Champlin and Fred Willard. Tom Canning led the house band, and Fred Silverman was the show's producer. The announcer was Charlie Tuna.

The show was produced by MGM Television in association with Metromedia, distributed in syndication by MGM/UA Television Distribution

Debut
Intended as a rival to The Tonight Show Starring Johnny Carson, the series debuted on September 5, 1983.  It was hosted by Canadian actor and songwriter Alan Thicke, who was well known in his home country for hosting The Alan Thicke Show, a popular daytime talk show that ended when Thicke was signed to do the American show.

Its debut was preceded by a concerted publicity campaign. When the series made it to air, it was unable to compete against the Tonight Show in the ratings, and critics were not kind to its unorthodox blend of stand-up comedy, sketch comedy, and talk show, which would later become staples of late night talk shows. The program also featured musical performances; a March 1984 episode of the show marked the network television debut of the Red Hot Chili Peppers, who performed two songs from their debut album.

Retooling and cancellation
As the season progressed, and with several stations having dropped the show mid-season, it was retooled to more closely resemble Thicke's popular Canadian talk show. Original house band The Tom Canning Band was replaced by The John Tobin Band, the regulars were dropped, and Thicke's then-wife Gloria Loring joined the cast, as did Los Angeles-area talk-show host Wally George, on a semi-regular basis. However, none of these changes helped boost the show's ratings, and at the end of the 1983–84 season, it was cancelled.  Thicke said of the cancellation: "Thicke of the Night was supposed to challenge Johnny Carson. They said it couldn't be done and I was the guy they chose to prove it. The show was ahead of its time... it should've been on in 2084, when all of us are dead."

A year later, Thicke attained American TV stardom with the series Growing Pains.

The show was later satirized in an SCTV skit as Maudlin O'The Night. After the show's cancellation, it inspired a Saturday Night Live skit, In Thickeness and In Health.

See also

List of late-night American network TV programs

References

External links
 

First-run syndicated television programs in the United States
American late-night television shows
1980s American television talk shows
1980s American variety television series
1983 American television series debuts
1984 American television series endings
English-language television shows
Television series by Metromedia
Television series by MGM Television